The 1950 Humboldt State Lumberjacks football team represented Humboldt State College during the 1950 college football season. Humboldt State competed in the Far Western Conference (FWC).

The 1950 Lumberjacks were led by head coach Ted Staffler in his second and last year at the helm. They played home games at the Redwood Bowl in Arcata, California. Due to injuries, the Lumberjacks cancelled the last three games of the season. Humboldt State finished with a record of zero wins, four losses and one tie (0–4–1, 0–4 FWC). The Lumberjacks were outscored by their opponents 28–200 for the season.

The Lumberjacks did not win a game during Ted Staffler's tenure at Humboldt State. They finished 0–12–2. His winning percentage is the lowest in school history.

Schedule

Notes

References

Humboldt State
Humboldt State Lumberjacks football seasons
College football winless seasons
Humboldt State Lumberjacks football